Andrew Chrysoberges, also called Andrew of Rhodes or Andrew of Colossus (died 1440), was a Greek Dominican prelate and theologian.

He was Greek by birth, and born to Eastern Orthodox parents. In early youth he had no opportunities for education, but afterwards devoted himself to Latin and Greek, and to theology, especially the questions in dispute between the Latin and Greek Churches. The study of the early Fathers, both Greek and Latin, convinced him that in the disputed points, truth was on the side of the Latin Church. He therefore solemnly abjured his error, made a profession of faith, and entered the Dominican Order about the time of the Western Schism. He led thenceforth an apostolic life.

He was especially earnest in his efforts to induce his fellow-Greeks to follow in his footsteps and reunite with Rome. In 1413 he was made Archbishop of Rhodes. The Dominican biographer, Jacques Échard, credits him with having taken an active part in the twentieth session of the Council of Constance (1414–18). Others maintain that there is here a confusion with Andrew of Colaczy, in Hungary.

At the Council of Basle, he delivered an oration in the name of the Pope (Mansi, XXIX, 468–481). He took part in the Council of Ferrara-Florence, and was one of the six theologians appointed by the papal legate, Cardinal Julian Cesarini, to reply to the objections of the Greeks. He proved that it was fully within the province of the Church to add the Filioque clause to the Creed, and that the Greek Fathers had been of the same opinion.

After the close of the Council, trouble arose between the Latins and Greeks in Cyprus; the latter accused the former of refusing to hold communion with them. Andrew was sent thither by Pope Eugene IV, and succeeded in establishing peace. He also succeeded in overcoming the local forms of the Nestorian, Eutychian, and Monothelite heresies. The heretical bishops abjured and made a profession of faith at a synod held at Nicosia; some of the prelates went afterwards to Rome to renew their profession before the Holy See.

There are preserved in the Vatican manuscript copies of his treatise on the divine essence and operation, compiled from the commentaries of St. Thomas Aquinas, and addressed to Cardinal Bessarion also a little work in the form of a dialogue in reply to a letter of Mark of Ephesus against the rites and ceremonies of the Roman Church (Patrologia Graeca, CL, 862).

References
Quétif and Échard, SS. Ord. Praed, I, 801
Hefele, Concilieng., VII, 472, 681, et al.
Schmidt in Kirchenlexikon I, 835
Antoine Touron, Hommes ill. de l'ordre de S. Dominique, s.v.
Hugo von Hurter, Nomenclator (2d ed.), II, 821
Bzovius, Ann. Eccl. ad an, 1438, x 8
Joseph Hergenröther (ed.) The Mystagogia of Photius, 146 sqq.

Attribution

1440 deaths
Converts to Roman Catholicism from Eastern Orthodoxy
Former Greek Orthodox Christians
Greek Dominicans
Greek theologians
Year of birth unknown
15th-century Roman Catholic archbishops in Cyprus
People from Constantinople